Sediminicola arcticus is a Gram-negative, psychrophilic, rod-shaped and non-motile bacterium from the genus of Sediminicola which has been isolated from deep-sea sediments from the Arctic Ocean.

References

Flavobacteria
Bacteria described in 2015